The Anderson Paramount Theatre (now known as The Paramount Theatre Centre & Ballroom) is a historic movie theater located in Anderson, Madison County, Indiana.  It opened on August 20, 1929, and at the time was part of the Publix Chain of theaters, owned by Paramount Pictures (hence the theater's name). The theater was designed by the famous movie theater architect, John Eberson. The Paramount is an atmospheric theater (an architectural style that gave the appearance of an open star-filled sky) and is one of twelve atmospheric theaters left standing in the United States and Canada. The auditorium was decorated in the style of a Spanish village.

It was listed in the National Register of Historic Places in 1991.

The theater has been extensively restored and reopened in 1995 as the Paramount Theatre Centre and Ballroom. The theater includes its original Page theater organ, now restored.  A contest for "Best Decorated Christmas Tree" is held in the theater every Christmas.

References

 Anderson: A pictorial history, by Esther Dittlinger, copyright 1990

External links

 Anderson Paramount Theatre Centre & Ballroom

Theatres on the National Register of Historic Places in Indiana
Buildings and structures in Anderson, Indiana
1929 establishments in Indiana
Movie palaces
Theatres completed in 1929
Atmospheric theatres
John Eberson buildings
Tourist attractions in Anderson, Indiana
National Register of Historic Places in Madison County, Indiana
Historic district contributing properties in Indiana
Public venues with a theatre organ